The carrom ball (also known as the sodukku ball in parts of India) is a style of spin bowling delivery used in cricket. The ball is released by flicking it between the thumb and a bent middle finger in order to impart spin.

Origin and history
The first bowler known to have used this style of delivery was the Australian Jack Iverson from Victoria, who used it throughout his Test cricket career in the period after the Second World War, although he did not use the name "carrom ball". Fellow Australian John Gleeson used a similar grip a decade later, but by the end of the 1970s the method was almost forgotten. It has since re-entered cricketing consciousness because of its use by Ajantha Mendis of Sri Lanka, with the new name of carrom ball. Mendis unveiled this delivery during the 2008 Asia Cup. Ravichandran Ashwin calls his variation the 'sodukku ball'. In the Tamil language, sodukku means "snapping of fingers". This is reflected in the way the ball is delivered, by a "snap" of the middle finger and the thumb. Ashwin says that he first learned to bowl this type of delivery playing street cricket in Chennai, from another youth whom he only knew by the initials SK. Ashwin was so surprised by SK's control and variation, that over the next several days he learned the technique from SK. Later in his childhood he perfected the delivery with a real cricket ball. He took nine wickets in his debut Test against the West Indies in November 2011 and used the carrom ball to dismiss Marlon Samuels in the second innings. New Zealander Mitchell Santner is believed to be the first left handed spin bowler to have used the method in international cricket, dismissing Pakistan opener Fakhar Zaman with a delivery in the carrom ball style during a one-day international match on January 16, 2018.

Method
The ball is held between the thumb, forefinger and the middle finger and, instead of a conventional release, the ball is squeezed out and flicked by the fingers like a carrom player flicking the disc on a carrom board. It is different from wrist-bowled deliveries. Traditional leg-spin is bowled with anti-clockwise wrist movement for a right-armed bowler, while Muttiah Muralitharan's special type of off-spin is bowled with clockwise wrist movement. A finger-bowled delivery such as traditional off-spin is bowled with a clockwise finger movement. In a carrom delivery, the middle finger and thumb flick or squeeze the ball out of the hand, like a carrom player flicking a striker in the indoor game of carrom. When the centre finger is gripped towards the leg side, the ball spins from leg to off; when the centre finger is gripped towards the off side, the ball spins from off to leg. Depending on the degree the ball is gripped towards the leg side, the carrom ball could also travel straight. The carrom ball can therefore spin to either the off or leg sides or travel straight (as opposed to the misconception that it only spins towards the off side).

References

External links

See also
 Doosra
 Googly
 Leg spin
 Off spin
 Wrist spin
 Top Spin
 Flipper Ball

Bowling (cricket)
Cricket terminology